István Robotka (born 5 January 1958) is a Hungarian wrestler. He competed in the men's freestyle 100 kg at the 1988 Summer Olympics.

References

External links
 

1958 births
Living people
Hungarian male sport wrestlers
Olympic wrestlers of Hungary
Wrestlers at the 1988 Summer Olympics
People from Pásztó
Sportspeople from Nógrád County